Hongxing may refer to:
 Hongxing, Tibet, a village in the Tibet Autonomous Region of China

In the People's Republic of China:
 Hongxing District, a district of the city of Yichun, Heilongjiang province
 Hongxing, Harbin, a town in the Harbin prefecture of Heilongjiang
 Hongxing, Mingshan County, a town in the Mingshan County of Sichuan
 Hongxing Township, Yi County, Anhui, a township-level division of Anhui
 Hongxing Township, Yongtai County, a township-level division of Fujian
 Hongxing Township, Zhao'an County, a township-level division of Fujian
 Hongxing Subdistrict, Baoding, a township-level division of Hebei
 Hongxing Subdistrict, Yichun, Heilongjiang, a township-level division of Heilongjiang
 Hongxing Township, Jixi, a township-level division of Heilongjiang
 Hongxing Township, Lanxi County, a township-level division of Heilongjiang
 Hongxing Township, Yi'an County, a township-level division of Heilongjiang